MardiGrass is a cannabis law reform rally and festival held annually in the town of Nimbin, in north east New South Wales, Australia.

History
In March 1993, after a decade of raids and arrests, and a particularly intensive recent period of random street searches, arrests and rough treatment, a spontaneous demonstration erupted, and marched to the police station, pelting it with eggs and toilet paper. Negative newspaper reports followed. Nimbin Hemp Embassy (formerly "Nimbin Hemp") members decided to hold a peaceful protest in a non-confrontational atmosphere that ordinary people could comfortably attend, on 1 May 1993. That was the first MardiGrass. (The spelling is that officially used by the MardiGrass Organising Body) The MardiGrass Organising Body (MOB) was formed to manage the event and consists entirely of volunteers. The intention is to hold a MardiGrass every year until prohibition ends.

The first MardiGrass – 1993

In March 1993 the Nimbin police station had already been laid siege. Undercover police officers had been discovered buying cannabis in the area. This enraged a small portion of the townsfolk to such an extent that they chased the police officers back to the police station and pelted them with eggs. Concerned about bad publicity some of the townsfolk decided to come up with a more peaceful form of protest that ordinary people could comfortably join. Bob Hopkins (a.k.a. The Plantem) was the man who came up with the idea of MardiGrass.

On 1 May 1993 people gathered by the local creek for the rally. They also had a good time with their colourful bright clothing coloured with dye of food colouring. Bob, dressed as a nun led the people while blowing on a tuba. There was only a small group at the start (along with a giant joint made of a large sheet and other assorted household goods).

The big joint acted as a giant magnet for the townsfolk. By the time they reached the police station they were, by most accounts, over a thousand strong.

Shortly after, backup arrived, but not before the media who began to broadcast images of the event to the country and world. The cops found themselves in the unenviable situation of not being able to act against the townsfolk. They were unable to use aggressive force against them on camera, and as such watched on as the protesters marched forward.

In the evening of this historic event, Bob Hopkins channelled the spirit of the Plantem for the first time and he and his friends, after adopting Winston Churchill's V for victory sign, vowed to hold MardiGrass annually until the war on cannabis was over.

Description
The protest rally and parade is held on the first weekend in May, and is the core element of MardiGrass; the centre of a festival weekend containing events such as the Hemp Olympix, including Joint Rolling, Bong Throw and Yell and Growers Iron-person events; also including the Nimbin Cannabis Cup, Harvest Ball, Picker's Ball, live music and dance parties. The "Protest Rally and Parade" is held on the Sunday, gathers opposite the police station and then marches away, through the village to Peace Park, accompanied by the traditional "Big Joint" and dancing Ganja Faeries. MardiGrass is a participant in the Global Marijuana March

Gallery

See also

Doof
List of festivals in Australia
List of cannabis competitions
Cannabis in Australia

Sources

External links
Nimbin MardiGrass
Ganja Faeries
Nimbin Hemp Embassy

Mardi Gras
Cannabis events
Festivals in New South Wales
Protest marches
Festivals established in 1993
1993 in cannabis
Cannabis in Australia
Parades in Australia
Doofs
1993 establishments in Australia